(born 18 March 1976) is a retired Japanese tennis player, winner of professional tournaments in doubles and singles, and a representative of Japan for the Federation Cup.

Career
Saeki's career began officially in April 1994. As a junior finale, she boasts a doubles tournament in the youth edition of the Japan Open. In senior tennis, she began mainly outside the main cycle of the WTA Tour, winning a total of 16 singles and eight doubles titles belonging to the ITF Women's Circuit. She gained four wins in doubles on WTA Tour, with her partners - Yuka Yoshida and Naoko Kijimuta. Her career-high ranking was at No. 56 in singles (June 1998) and No. 49 in doubles (July 1997).

In 1998-1999 she appeared in the Japanese team for the Federation Cup (only singles). Defeated, among others well-known Dutch woman Miriam Oremans, and the total balance of the performances is a tie - three wins and three defeats.

WTA career finals

Doubles: 4 (4 titles)

ITF Circuit finals

Singles: 18 (16–2)

Doubles: 10 (8–2)

External links
 
 
 

1976 births
Living people
Japanese female tennis players
Tennis people from New York (state)
Sportspeople from Tokyo
Asian Games medalists in tennis
Tennis players at the 2002 Asian Games
Medalists at the 2002 Asian Games
Asian Games silver medalists for Japan
Asian Games bronze medalists for Japan
20th-century Japanese women
21st-century Japanese women